Samut Sakhon Hospital is the main public hospital of Samut Sakhon Province, Thailand and is classified under the Ministry of Public Health as a regional hospital. It is an affiliated teaching hospital of the Faculty of Medicine Siriraj Hospital, Mahidol University.

History 
Samut Sakhon Hospital was the last provincial hospital to be constructed in Thailand at the time. Construction began on 14 October 1958, initiated by San Ekmahachai, the governor of Samut Sakhon Province. The building was completed and opened on 9 December 1959. It became a provincial hospital in 2017 and has passed a total of 4 hospital accreditations.

See also 
 Healthcare in Thailand
 Hospitals in Thailand
 List of hospitals in Thailand

References 

Hospitals in Thailand
Samut Sakhon province